Galena, Nevada is the name of two former communities:

 Galena, Lander County, Nevada, a ghost town
 Galena, Washoe County, Nevada, an abandoned town